FuLe International Ceramic Art Museum (abbreviated FLICAM) is situated outside Xi'an in Shaanxi province, China. The museum consists of pavilions dedicated to individual countries or regions, exhibiting work by ceramic artists from each country created during a residency at the museum.

The first museum pavilions opened in 2005, for France and Scandinavia, followed in 2007 by museums for Australasia and North America. In 2008, ceramic artists are invited from Great Britain, the Netherlands and Belgium.

FLICAM was conceived and is sponsored by Xu Dufeng, chairman of the Futo Industrial Group.

See also 
 Ceramics museum

References

External links 
 FLICAM website

Art museums established in 2005
Ceramics museums in China
Contemporary art galleries in China
Museums in Shaanxi
Art museums and galleries in China
2005 establishments in China